The Alexander Nevsky Cathedral was a Russian Orthodox Cathedral in Saxon Square built in Warsaw, Poland, then a part of the Russian Empire. The cathedral was designed by the distinguished Russian architect Leon Benois, and was built between 1894 and 1912. When it was finally completed, it was 70 metres in height, at that time, the tallest building in Warsaw.

It was demolished in mid-1920s by the Polish authorities less than 15 years after its construction. The negative connotations in Poland associated with Russian imperial policy towards Poland, and belief it was built purposely to hurt Polish national feelings,  was cited as the major motive by the proponents of the demolition, especially since the church occupied one of Warsaw's main squares.  The cathedral shared the fate of many Orthodox churches demolished after the polity of Congress Poland regained its independence from Imperial Russia.

Background

Warsaw became part of Imperial Russia in 1815, following the territorial rearrangements decided at the Congress of Vienna. The former capital of Poland, which ceased to exist in 1795 following the partitions of Poland, became a major administrative center in the Russian Empire, and one of its largest cities. By the second half of the 19th century, Warsaw housed a large Russian military garrison as a result of two failed uprisings against Russian rule. These developments were accompanied by a significant influx of Russian soldiers and officials into the city, most of them of the Russian Orthodox faith. Nearly 20 Russian Orthodox churches were built in Warsaw in the 1890s, primarily to accommodate the needs of the military.

The idea of building a large Orthodox cathedral in Warsaw was expressed in a letter from the Governor General of Poland, Joseph Vladimirovich Gourko, to Alexander III of Russia. He indicated that the Orthodox churches in Warsaw at that time were able to accommodate less than one tenth of the city's 42,000 Orthodox residents, who urgently needed a new place of worship.

Construction
On August 28, 1893, a special committee for the construction of the new cathedral was organized, with Gourko as its head. The committee adopted the design proposed by Leon Benois and construction began in 1894. The place chosen as site of the cathedral was a monument raised by Russian authorities in memory of Polish generals who were executed in the November Uprising by Poles for collaborating with the Russian Empire.

Tsar Alexander III gave his approval to fund the cathedral on the date of the anniversary of the partitions of Poland in 1893 which was celebrated as the "joining of the West Russian state".

A significant part of the funds needed to build the cathedral were raised by personal donations from almost every corner of the Russian Empire. In an appeal to Moscow's residents, Gourko's chancellery wrote:

The rest of the funds came from mandatory donations required from all municipalities within Gourko's jurisdiction and special tax increases within the city of Warsaw . The mostly non-Russian-Orthodox population who had to provide these funds resented being forced to contribute, adding to the political controversy surrounding the project.

By 1900, the construction of the building was largely finished and on November 9, the Latin cross was erected on the main cupola. At the end of the construction, the 70-meter (230 feet), bell tower was the tallest building in Warsaw.

Work on the interior of the cathedral, designed by Nikolay Pokrovsky, continued for another 12 years. The frescoes were painted by Viktor Vasnetsov. The cathedral was decorated with 16 mosaic panels designed by Vasnetsov and Andrei Ryabushkin.  The decorations of the cathedral used precious and semi-precious stones extensively, marble, and granite. The altar was decorated with  jasper columns. The largest of the 14 bells was the fifth-largest in the empire.

On May 20, 1912, the ceremonial dedication of the cathedral to Alexander Nevsky was held, where Archbishop Nicholas of Warsaw said:

Demolition

During World War I, the Russians evacuated Warsaw in August 1915.  They took with them most of the Orthodox inhabitants and clergy, as well as many precious works of art from the cathedral.  During the German occupation in 1915–1918 the cathedral was used by the German military as a garrison church and renamed for St Henry. They appropriated the valuable copper roof, towards their war effort, leading to increasing water damage inside the church. They also made some alterations to the cathedral to suit their needs, such as adding a pipe organ and chairs for the worshippers, as a rule not found in Orthodox churches.

After Poland regained its independence in 1918, the fate of the cathedral was the subject of an intense debate for a number of years. It was perceived by the Polish inhabitants of Warsaw as a symbol of Russian domination and hence was very unpopular, and the Stefan Batory University Arts Faculty estimated it as having little artistic value.

There were proposals to make it into a Catholic church. Among other proposals, the famous Polish writer Stefan Żeromski argued that the Cathedral might be the best place for the Museum of the Martyrology of Polish people. Others argued on more utilitarian grounds that a church constructed as recently as 1912, and taking up valuable space in one of Warsaw's main squares, was not a significant enough work of architecture to be preserved, given that most of the Russian Orthodox believers had left the city when Russian rule ended.

In the end, despite a few protests, it was demolished in 1924–1926, along with all but two Orthodox churches in Warsaw. Adding to the political and nationwide character to the destruction of the largest Orthodox Cathedral in interwar Poland, the Warsaw magistrate issued public bonds to "give a chance to every Pole to take part in the action." The bonds were backed by the value of the materials recovered during demolition.

Occasional attempts to save the cathedral continued even while demolition was underway. For example, in the summer of 1924 an Orthodox member of the Polish Senate, Vyacheslav Bogdanovich, gave a passionate speech in favour of preserving the cathedral. However, overall such voices were few and far between. The proponents of its preservation in its original form were contemptuously called the "Cathedralists", thus implicitly accusing them of an underlying lack of patriotism.

The demolition itself was complex, and required almost 15,000 controlled explosions. Much of the high quality marble obtained during the demolition was reused in the decoration of various Warsaw buildings. The mosaics were carefully disassembled and some of them taken to the Orthodox cathedral in Baranowicze (Baranavichy). After many years of storage in the National Museum in Warsaw, other fragments  were installed in the Mary Magdalene Orthodox Cathedral in the Warsaw suburb of Praga.

See also
 Alexander Nevsky
 Other Alexander Nevsky Cathedrals
 Field Cathedral of the Polish Army, another cathedral in Warsaw that used to be an Orthodox church
 Warsaw Palace of Culture and Science, a monumental building in central Warsaw, constructed by the Soviet Union in the Polish People's Republic.
 Palace of the Republic, Berlin, the now demolished seat of parliament of the former German Democratic Republic
 St. Florian's Cathedral

Footnotes

References

 Gallery of photos, showing cathedral's demolition
 Another photo gallery
 Extensive description
 1920 article from Tygodnik Ilustrowany

Churches completed in 1912
20th-century Eastern Orthodox church buildings
Buildings and structures demolished in the 1920s
Cathedrals in Poland
Churches in Warsaw
Destroyed churches in Poland
Former churches in Poland
Eastern Orthodox churches in Poland
Demolished buildings and structures in Poland
Warsaw
1912 establishments in the Russian Empire
20th-century churches in Poland
Buildings and structures demolished in 1926